Rudolf Peyfuss is an Austrian luger who competed in the early 1950s. He won a gold medal in the men's doubles event at the 1951 European luge championships in Igls, Austria.

References

Austrian male lugers
Possibly living people
Year of birth missing